Sergeyeva, Sergeeva or Sergejeva (Russian: Сергеева) is a common Russian female surname, which may refer to

Ella Sergeyeva, Russian rower
Galina Sergeyeva (1914–2000), Russian actress
Irina Sergeyeva (born 1968), Russian sprint athlete and Olympic gold medallist in hurdling
Maria Sergeyeva, Russian political activist
Maria Sergeyeva, Kazakhstani chess grandmaster
Maria Sergejeva (born 1992), Estonian figure skater
Maria Sergeeva (born 2001), Russian rhythmic gymnast
Natalya Sergeyeva (born 1976), Kazakhstani sprint canoe racer
Svetlana Sergeeva (born 1986), Russian athlete
Tatyana Sergeyeva (born 1951), Russian composer

See also
Sergeyev, male variant of Sergeeyva